Monique Bernice Rodahl, later Williams (born 29 June 1960) is a New Zealand swimmer. She competed in three events at the 1976 Summer Olympics.

She is the granddaughter of Dutch Olympic cyclist Bernard Leene.

References

External links
 

1960 births
Living people
New Zealand female swimmers
Olympic swimmers of New Zealand
Swimmers at the 1976 Summer Olympics
Swimmers from Auckland
Swimmers at the 1974 British Commonwealth Games
Commonwealth Games competitors for New Zealand